Antithrixia is a genus of flowering plants in the daisy family, Asteraceae.

There is only one known species, Antithrixia flavicoma, native to Cape Province in South Africa.

References

Gnaphalieae
Monotypic Asteraceae genera
Endemic flora of South Africa
Taxa named by Augustin Pyramus de Candolle